S. Anselm's Preparatory School is a private school located in Bakewell, Derbyshire, in the heart of the Peak District. Founded in 1888. Winner of the Tatler Schools Guide title: Prep School of the Year 2021, it offers flexi, weekly and full boarding for pupils aged 3–13.

History 
S Anselm's was founded in 1888 by William Storrs Fox. In the first years it was a boys' boarding preparatory school. Storrs Fox was a graduate of Cambridge and a naturalist. He quickly established the reputation of the school. He took as a motto for the school 'Esse quam videri' (to be, rather than to seem). Already after a year he constructed an aviary in the school garden.

References

External links 
School Website
Profile on the ISC website

Private schools in Derbyshire
Boarding schools in Derbyshire
Educational institutions established in 1888
1888 establishments in England